Luke Wood (born 2 August 1995) is an English cricketer who plays for England and Lancashire. Primarily a left-arm fast bowler, he also bats left-handed. He made his first-class debut for Nottinghamshire against Sussex in September 2014. He made his international debut in 2022

In April 2022, he was bought by the Trent Rockets for the 2022 season of The Hundred. The following month, Wood was named in England's One Day International (ODI) squad for their series against the Netherlands. In September 2022, he was named in the England's T20I squad for the series against Pakistan. He made his T20I debut on 20 September 2022, against Pakistan. Wood made his ODI debut on 17 November 2022, against Australia.

In BPL 2023, He was taken by Sylhet Strikers franchise. He played a crucial part in the Qualifier 2 conceding just 3 runs in the penultimate over helping Sylhet reach the final of BPL 2023.

References

External links
 

1995 births
Living people
Cricketers from Sheffield
English cricketers
England Twenty20 International cricketers
Nottinghamshire cricketers
Worcestershire cricketers
Northamptonshire cricketers
Lancashire cricketers
English cricketers of the 21st century
Trent Rockets cricketers